Zeleke is a surname. Notable people with the surname include:

Belay Zeleke (1912–1945), Ethiopian leader of the patriots in Gojjam and Wällo, who participated in the resistance against the Italians during the occupation
Natnael Zeleke, Ethiopian footballer
Yared Zeleke, Ethiopian film director